Valley of the Moon may refer to:
Crestline, California, has a small neighborhood near Lake Gregory in the San Bernardino Mountains called Valley of the Moon
Sonoma Valley, California, often called The Valley of the Moon
Wadi Rum, also known as The Valley of the Moon, a valley in Jordan
Ischigualasto Provincial Park, Argentina, also called Valley of the Moon 
Valley of the Moon (Tucson, Arizona), children's fantasy park listed on the National Register of Historic Places listings in Pima County, Arizona
The Valley of the Moon (novel), 1913 novel written by Jack London
Valley of the Moon (1914 film), a 1914 silent film
Valley of the Moon (album) by the band Lovecraft, see H.P. Lovecraft (band)
Valley of the Moon, a short film featuring Dylan Riley Snyder

See also
Moon Valley (disambiguation)
Valle de la Luna (disambiguation)
Valley of the Moon Commute Club, a former bus service in the San Francisco Bay Area